Yong Jun-hyung (Hangul: 용준형; born Yong Jae-soon on December 19, 1989), commonly known as Junhyung, is a South Korean singer-songwriter, rapper, record producer and actor. Junhyung rose to fame as a member of South Korean boy band Highlight (formerly known as Beast), formed in 2009. He departed from Highlight in 2019, amidst the controversy of admitting to watch illegal videos, although the police stated that Junhyung was only considered as a witness at that point in time in the Burning Sun scandal.

As a solo artist, he released one extended play, Flower (2013), and one full-length album, Goodbye 20's (2018). His also starred in the Korean dramas Monstar (2013) and Coffee, Do Me a Favor (2018).

Early life
Junhyung was born in Seoul, South Korea. He changed his birth name Yong Jae-soon to his current name when he was in 6th grade. In 2007, he joined the boy band Xing, which included Kevin Woo (ex-U-KISS). Junhyung was known by the stage name Poppin' Dragon while in Xing.

Career

Beast/Highlight 

Junhyung debuted under Cube Entertainment as a member of the boy band Beast in 2009. The group released their first extended play Beast Is the B2ST on October 14, 2009. The group released a total of eight extended plays and three studio albums.

In 2016, Beast left Cube Entertainment, and formed their own label, Around Us Entertainment. The group debuted under the new name of Highlight. As Highlight, they released two extended plays.

Solo activities 
In 2010, Junhyung was featured as a rapper in songs by other artists, including Hyuna's debut single "Change," the Asian remix of Amerie's "Heard 'em All," and G.NA's single "I'll Back Off So You Can Live Better." In 2011, Junhyung was featured on the songs "Heartsore Story" by Wheesung, "A Bitter Day" by Hyuna, "Be Quiet" by Kim Wan-sun, and "Don't Act Countrified" by ALi.

Junhyung released his first solo single, "Living Without You," on February 3, 2012. The song reached #8 on the Gaon Digital Chart. That summer, he made a cameo appearance on the sitcom Salamander Guru and The Shadows. Later that year, Junhyung produced fellow Beast member Yang Yo-seob's debut solo EP, The First Collage, and was featured on the lead single, "Caffeine."

In February 2013, Junhyung released the single "You Got Some Nerve" with LE of EXID and Feeldog of Big Star. The song reached #13 on the Gaon Digital Chart. Starting in May, Junhyung starred in the Korean drama Monstar, alongside Ha Yeon-soo and Kang Ha-neul. The series aired on Mnet and wrapped up in August. Junhyung won Best New Actor at the 2013 Korean Drama Awards for his depiction of a teen idol in the series.

Junhyung released his debut solo EP, Flower, on December 13, 2013. The EP debuted at #4 on the Gaon Album Chart, and the title track "Flower" peaked at #23 on the Gaon Digital Chart.

In 2015, Junhyung starred in the Cube Entertainment online reality series, Yong Jun-hyung's Good Life, alongside his songwriting and music production partner Kim Tae-joo. From 2016 to 2017, he co-hosted the third season of the variety show Hitmaker alongside comedian Jeong Hyeong-don. In 2017, Junhyung was also a cast member on the first season of the variety show It's Dangerous Beyond the Blankets. He returned to the show for the second season in 2018.

Junhyung released his first solo full-length album, Goodbye 20's, on May 9, 2018. The album debuted at #2 on the Gaon Album Chart. That year, he also starred in the Korean drama, Coffee, Do Me a Favor, which is based on the webtoon of the same name.

He quietly enlisted for his mandatory military service on April 2, 2019 as an active duty soldier. On September 25, 2020, it was announced that Junhyung had suffered a knee injury, and he would complete the rest of his service as a public service worker. He was discharged on February 26, 2021.

On November 15, 2021, Junhyung left Around Us Entertainment after his contract expired.

On September 27, 2022, it was announced that Junhyung would be releasing a new album in the near future, which would be his first solo comeback in four years and also his first since his departure from Around Us Entertainment. On October 11, he announced his first EP Loner, set to release on October 30, under his independent label Black Made.

In October 2022 it was confirmed that Yong will hold his solo concert 'LONER's ROOM' at Yes24 Live Hall in Seoul on November 4 and 5, and will make a comeback with his new EP album "Loner" on October 30. However, the label announced the postponement of the album due to the national mourning period following the Seoul Halloween crowd crush incident on the 29th.And his solo concert was postponed as well.Yong has confirmed the release schedule for the new album on November 10.

On March 2, 2023, Yong will release "POST IT" (Feat. Xion) with the same name and "Til' the End", both composed by Yong.

Controversy
On March 11, 2019, Jun-hyung was accused of being a part of the group chatroom with Jung Joon-young where Jung shared hidden camera footage and sexually explicit images. On March 12, it was revealed that Jun-hyung's part in the group chat was actually edited in, and it has been confirmed that Jung and Jun-hyung had a one-on-one chat room with each other, but Jun-hyung was not a part of the group chatroom where the hidden camera footage and photos were shared. On March 14, Jun-hyung announced he was leaving Highlight, after he admitted to watching an illegal video sent to him by Jung, who is under investigation for secretly filming women during sex; a part of the Burning Sun scandal. The police stated that he is being considered only as a witness at this point in time.

On April 2, Around Us Entertainment announced Jun's military enlistment through an official statement. He completed his military service in February 2021.

Philanthropy 
On March 7, 2022, Yong donated 10 million won to the Hope Bridge Disaster Relief Association to help the victims of the massive wildfire that started in Uljin, Gyeongbuk and has spread to Samcheok, Gangwon.

Discography

 Goodbye 20's (2018)

Filmography

Reality shows

Variety shows

Dramas

Concert 
 LONER's ROOM (2023)

Awards and nominations

References

External links

Highlight (band) members
1989 births
K-pop singers
Living people
Cube Entertainment artists
South Korean male singers
South Korean pop singers
South Korean male television actors
South Korean male idols
South Korean male rappers
South Korean singer-songwriters
South Korean record producers
Rappers from Seoul
Anyang Arts High School alumni
South Korean male singer-songwriters
South Korean hip hop record producers